The 1944 United States Senate elections coincided with the re-election of Franklin D. Roosevelt to his fourth term as president. The 32 seats of Class 3 were contested in regular elections, and three special elections were held to fill vacancies. 

The Democrats retained their large majority, although they lost a net of one seat to the Republicans. As Republicans won open seats in Indiana, New Jersey, and Missouri, and defeated an incumbent in Iowa. However, Democrats defeated incumbents in Connecticut, Pennsylvania, and North Dakota.

Results summary 

Colored shading indicates party with largest share of that row.

Source: Clerk of the U.S. House of Representatives

Gains, losses, and holds

Retirements
One Republican and five Democrats retired instead of seeking re-election.

Defeats
Four Republicans and five Democrats sought re-election but lost in the primary or general election.

Change in composition

Before the elections
At the beginning of 1944.

Election results

Race summaries

Special elections during the 78th Congress 
In these special elections, the winner was seated during 1944 or before January 3, 1945; ordered by election date.

Races leading to the 79th Congress 
In these general elections, the winners were elected for the term beginning January 3, 1945; ordered by state.

All of the elections involved the Class 3 seats.

Closest races 
Fourteen races had a margin of victory under 10%:

Utah was the tipping point state with a margin of 19.8%.

Alabama

Arizona 

Three-term Democrat Carl T. Hayden was easily re-elected.

Hayden would be re-elected three more times before retiring in 1962.

Arkansas

California

Colorado

Connecticut

Florida

Georgia

Idaho

Illinois

Indiana 

There were 2 elections in Indiana, due to the January 25, 1944, death of Democrat Frederick Van Nuys.

Democrat Samuel D. Jackson was appointed to continue the term, pending a special election. Republican William E. Jenner won the special election to finish the term, and Republican Homer E. Capehart won the general election to the next term.

Indiana (special)

Indiana (regular)

Iowa

Kansas

Kentucky

Louisiana

Maryland

Massachusetts (special) 

Republican Henry Cabot Lodge Jr. resigned February 3, 1944, to return to active duty in the U.S. Army during World War II.  Republican Sinclair Weeks was appointed February 8 to continue the term until an election was held.  A special election was held on November 7 with Republican Massachusetts Governor Leverett Saltonstall defeating his challengers.  He didn't take office until January 4, 1945, when his term as Governor ended.

Missouri

Nevada

New Hampshire

New Jersey (special)

New York 

The Socialist Labor state convention met on April 2 at the Cornish Arms Hotel, the corner of Eighth Avenue and Twenty-eighth Street, in New York City. They nominated Eric Hass for the U.S. Senate. At that time, the party used the name "Industrial Government Party" on the ballot, but was also referred to as the "Industrial Labor Party".

The Liberal Party was organized by a state convention with about 1,100 delegates who met on May 19 and 20 at the Roosevelt Hotel in New York City. They endorsed the incumbent Democratic U.S. Senator Robert F. Wagner for re-election. The party filed a petition to nominate candidates which was allowed by Secretary of State Curran on August 25.

The Republican State Committee met on August 8 at Albany, New York. They nominated Secretary of State Thomas J. Curran for the U.S. Senate.

The Democratic State Committee met on August 8 at the National Democratic Club at 233, Madison Avenue in New York City. They re-nominated the incumbent U.S. Senator Robert F. Wagner.

The American Labor state convention met on August 10. They endorsed the Democratic nominee Wagner.

The Democratic/American Labor/Liberal ticket was elected and incumbent Wagner was re-elected.

North Carolina

North Dakota

Ohio

Oklahoma

Oregon

Oregon (special)

Oregon (regular) 

Incumbent Republican Rufus C. Holman ran for re-election, but was defeated in the Republican primary by Wayne Morse.

Pennsylvania

South Carolina

South Dakota

Utah 

Incumbent Democratic Senator Elbert D. Thomas won a third term. As of 2022, this is the last time that a Democrat was elected to Utah's class 3 Senate seat.

Vermont

Washington

Wisconsin

See also 
 1944 United States elections
 1944 United States presidential election
1944 United States gubernatorial elections
 1944 United States House of Representatives elections
 78th United States Congress
 79th United States Congress

Notes

References 

 
United States home front during World War II